Porphyromonas somerae  is a Gram-negative and anaerobic bacterium from the genus of Porphyromonas which has been isolated from a human leg ulcer in the United States.

References 

Bacteroidia
Bacteria described in 2006